The 1983 VFL Grand Final was an Australian rules football game contested between the   Hawthorn Football Club and Essendon Football Club, held at the Melbourne Cricket Ground in Melbourne on 24 September 1983. It was the 87th annual Grand Final of the Victorian Football League, staged to determine the premiers for the 1983 VFL season. The match, attended by 110,332 spectators, was won by Hawthorn by a margin of 83 points, marking that club's fifth premiership victory.

Background

It was Essendon's first Grand Final appearance since losing the 1968 VFL Grand Final, while it was Hawthorn's first appearance since winning the 1978 VFL Grand Final.  The Bombers had not won a flag since winning the 1965 VFL Grand Final.

At the conclusion of the home and away season, Hawthorn had finished second on the VFL ladder (one game behind North Melbourne) with 15 wins and 7 losses. Essendon had finished fourth, also with 15 wins and 7 losses, but with an inferior percentage.

In the finals series leading up to the Grand Final, the Bombers defeated Carlton by 33 points in the Elimination Final before defeating Fitzroy in the First Semi-Final by 23 points. They advanced to the Grand Final after comfortably beating North Melbourne by 86 points in the Preliminary Final. The Hawks defeated Fitzroy in the Qualifying Final by just 4 points and then defeated North Melbourne by 40 points to progress to the Grand Final.

Match summary

The Hawks asserted their strength early, leading by 2.6 at quarter time, and then completely dominated the rest of the game, scoring seven goals to one in the second quarter and holding the Bombers goalless in the third quarter, whilst adding four goals of their own. Captain Leigh Matthews kicked six goals and the Hawks had nine other goal kickers. The Norm Smith Medal was awarded to Hawthorn's Colin Robertson for being judged the best player afield.

The margin of victory was at the time the biggest in Grand Final history, beating the record which had been set by Richmond in the 1980 VFL Grand Final, and stood until it was broken by Hawthorn in the 1988 VFL Grand Final.

This match was the first in what was to be an all-time record run of seven consecutive Grand Final appearances by the Hawks. It was also the first of three consecutive Grand Finals to be contested between these teams, with the Bombers winning the 1984 VFL Grand Final and 1985 VFL Grand Final.

Teams

Goalkickers

References
Hawks Headquarters page on the 1983 Grand Final
 The Official statistical history of the AFL 2004 
 Ross, J. (ed), 100 Years of Australian Football 1897-1996: The Complete Story of the AFL, All the Big Stories, All the Great Pictures, All the Champions, Every AFL Season Reported, Viking, (Ringwood), 1996.

See also
 1983 VFL season

VFL/AFL Grand Finals
Grand
Hawthorn Football Club
Essendon Football Club